Radoslav Školník (born 14 November 1979 in Košice) is a professional Slovak football defender who currently plays for FK Turkon Vyšné Opátske.

Career statistics

Last updated: 28 December 2009

External links
 Player profile at official club website

Living people
1979 births
Slovak footballers
FC VSS Košice players
Slovak Super Liga players
Sportspeople from Košice
Association football central defenders